Elian or Elián (Spanish) or Élian (French) can refer to:

People
Saint Elian (Syria) (died 284)
Church of Saint Elian (Arabic: كنيسة مار اليان, Kaneesat Mar Elian) is a church in Homs, Syria
Monastery of St. Elian a Syriac Catholic monastery near the town of Al-Qaryatayn, along a trade route between the two major cities of Palmyra
Saint Elian (Wales), a 5th-century Welsh saint
Elián González, a Cuban boy at the center of a 2000 custody and immigration controversy
Elián Herrera (baseball) (born 1985), Dominican Republic baseball player
Elián Herrera (model) (born 1991), Venezuelan model
Élian Périz (1984) Spanish female runner who specializes in the 800 metres

Other
Elian's Dublin, a Spanish international school in Bray, County Wicklow, Ireland
Elián (film), a 2017 documentary film about Elián González
Eretrian school, a school of philosophy also called the Elian School

See also
Eliana